Ansan University is a 3,4-year university located in Ansan City, Gyeonggi province, South Korea.  It hosts a student body of about four thousand, and offers programs in fields including nursing, physiotherapy, early childhood education, and information technology. The school was originally named Ansan 1 University.

History
The university opened its doors as Incheon health College of Nursing in 1972.  In 1994, it changed both its name and location, moving to its present site in Ansan and taking the name Ansan Technical College.  It was renamed Ansan University in 1998.

Department

Health Care
Department of Physical Cure
The Department of Nursing Science
The Clinical Laboratory
Department of Radiology
Department of Beauty, Art

Family, Social Practical Business Affairs
Food & Nutrition (College of Food & Nutrition) 
Hotel Cooking (College of Food & Nutrition) 
Social Welfare
Tourism English
Tourism Chinese
International Secretary (College of International Secretary)
International Secretarial Office Work (College of International Secretary)
Child Educating Course
Child Care

See also
Ansan
Education in South Korea
List of colleges and universities in South Korea

External links
Official school website, in Korean

Vocational education in South Korea
Nursing schools in South Korea
Universities and colleges in Gyeonggi Province
Education in Ansan
Sangnok-gu